Grand Progenitor or Supreme Progenitor is an East Asian temple name. It may refer to:

Taizu (disambiguation) - Chinese temple name
Taejo (disambiguation) - Korean temple name
Thái Tổ (disambiguation) - Vietnamese temple name